Slavko Mijušković (June 28, 1912 – December 15, 1989) was a Yugoslav historian, who studied the history of Montenegro and especially the Bay of Kotor.

Life
Mijušković was born in Kotor. He died in Kotor.

Work

Kotorska mornarica
Ustanak u Boki Kotorskoj 1869 : Zbornik radova sa naučnog skupa
Kulturna baština Balkana i seizmički problemi : radovi sa simpozijuma, Budva 15. i 16. IV 1982.
Pojava kute u orahovcu 1690 godine i kotorski zdravstveni magistrat.
Jedan nepoznati dokumenat u vezi proglašenja Petra I za sveca.
Stav tuđinskih vlasti prema narodnim običajima u Boki Kotorskoj.
Optužba državnog tužioca u Kotoru od 21 novembra 1921 godine protiv nekoliko istaknutih komunista.
 Turske mjere protiv ulcinjskih gusara
Borba za srpski jezik u Kotoru za vrijeme austrijske vladavine.
Osnivanje i djelovanje pomorsko-zdravstvenih ustanova u Boki Kotorskoj.

Mijušković stated that the Chronicle of the Priest of Duklja is a purely fictional literary product, belonging to the late 14th or early 15th century.

References

External links

1912 births
1989 deaths
Yugoslav historians
People from Kotor
Bay of Kotor